The Baseball Project's first album, Volume 1: Frozen Ropes and Dying Quails was released on Yep Roc Records on July 8, 2008. The album is available on compact disc and digitally on Yep Roc's site.

Track listing
"Past Time" (McCaughey) – 2:57
"Ted Fucking Williams" (Wynn) – 3:04
"Gratitude (For Curt Flood)" (Wynn) – 3:23
"Broken Man" (McCaughey) – 2:52
"Satchel Paige Said" (McCaughey) – 2:25
"Fernando" (Wynn) – 3:47
"Long Before My Time" (Wynn) – 3:14
"Jackie's Lament" (Wynn) – 3:25
"Sometimes I Dream of Willie Mays" (McCaughey) – 3:33
"The Death of Big Ed Delahanty" (Scott & Kevin McCaughey) – 3:35
"Harvey Haddix" (Wynn) – 4:25
"The Yankee Flipper" (McCaughey) – 3:40
"The Closer" (Wynn) – 4:24

Pre-order bonus track
"Blood Diamond" – 2:59

On-line bonus tracks
"Golden Sombrero" – 2:16
"The Ballad of Mike Kekich and Fritz Peterson" – 2:33

Personnel
The Baseball Project
Steve Wynn – vocals, guitars, organ, melodica
Scott McCaughey – vocals, bass, guitars, piano, accordion, harmonica,  percussion
Linda Pitmon – drums, vocals, percussion
Peter Buck – guitars, electric sitar, mandolin, bouzouki, 6-string bass

Production
Recorded by Adam Selzer at Jackpot!, Portland.
Mixed by Adam with Scott at Type Foundry, Portland
Mastered by Kurt Bloch for Light Bulb Ministries, Inc., Seattle

References

External links
Homepage

Sportsline review of the album

2008 debut albums
The Baseball Project albums
Yep Roc Records albums